Frank Adu Kwame (born May 16, 1985) is a Ghanaian footballer. Adu Kwame sometimes plays as a centre back but more commonly plays as a left back.

References

External links
 
 

1985 births
Living people
Association football defenders
Ghanaian expatriate footballers
Ghanaian footballers
Ekstraklasa players
I liga players
Berekum Chelsea F.C. players
Tanta SC players
CAPS United players
LZS Piotrówka players
Piast Gliwice players
Podbeskidzie Bielsko-Biała players
Wigry Suwałki players
Miedź Legnica players
Expatriate footballers in Poland
Ghanaian expatriate sportspeople in Poland